David K. Brown (1928–2008) was a noted British naval architect. Born in Leeds, he joined the Admiralty and became a member of the Royal Corps of Naval Constructors. He rose through the ranks to become the Deputy Chief Naval Architect, before retiring in 1988.

After retirement, he turned his attention to writing, publishing many books on the technical development of warships in the Royal Navy. He also authored the history of the Royal Corps of Naval Constructors published during the centenary of that organisation in 1983.

Brown died in Bath, Somerset, on 15 April 2008.

Books written

References

Writers from Leeds
2008 deaths
British naval architects
1928 births
Engineers from Yorkshire
20th-century British businesspeople